Secret world or Secret World may refer to:

Music
 "Secret World", a song by Peter Gabriel from his 1992 album Us
 Secret World Live, a 1994 album of Peter Gabriel's 1993 Secret World Tour
 Secret World Live (film), a 1994 DVD of Peter Gabriel's 1993 Secret World Tour
 "Secret World", a song by Tears for Fears from their 2004 album Everybody Loves a Happy Ending
 Secret World Live in Paris, a 2006 album by Tears for Fears from their 2005 world tour

Other
 Secret World (film), a 1969 French film starring Jacqueline Bisset
 Secret World wildlife rescue, a rescue centre in England
 The Secret World (radio series), a BBC comedy
 The Secret World, a 2012 multiplayer online video game
 Xplora1: Peter Gabriel's Secret World, a 1993 computer game

See also